The 2012 Team Speedway Junior European Championship was the fifth UEM Team Speedway Junior European Championship season. It was the first time that the event had been run as an under 21 years of age event.

The Final took place on 8 September 2012 in Landshut, Germany. Defending Champion are Russia team. The champion title was won by Poland team (48 points) who beat Denmark (41 pts), Ukraine (19 pts) and a Germany (11 pts).

Results

Heat details

Semifinal 1 
 27 April 2012
  Chervonograd
 Girnuk Stadium (Length: 365 m)

Semifinal 2 
 7 June 2012
  Opole

Final 
 8 September 2012
  Landshut

See also 
 2012 Team Speedway Junior World Championship
 2012 Individual Speedway Junior European Championship

References 

2012
European Team Junior